Carex conoides is a tussock-forming perennial in the family Cyperaceae, that is native to parts of China.

See also
 List of Carex species

References

conoides
Plants described in 1922
Taxa named by Georg Kükenthal
Flora of China